Eriphus rubellus is a species of beetle in the family Cerambycidae. It was described by Martins & Galileo in 2004.

References

Eriphus
Beetles described in 2004